Heather Nova (born Heather Allison Frith, July 6, 1968) is a Bermudian singer-songwriter and poet. , she has released eleven full-length albums, six EPs and twelve singles.

Biography
Heather Nova was born Heather Allison Frith on Bermuda, a British overseas territory. Her mother is a native of Nova Scotia, Canada, and her father is a native of Bermuda. Nova spent most of her childhood with her family, including one sister, television reporter and fashion model Susannah, and one brother, reggae singer Mishka, on a  sailboat (named Moon) built by her father, where the Friths spent most of the 1970s and part of the 1980s, sailing throughout the Atlantic and Caribbean waters and coasts. Since her idyllic childhood, Heather has played over 600 concerts, sold over 2 million albums and has a career of over 30 years in the music industry.

Nova started playing guitar and violin at an early age, writing her first song when she was 12. Nova enrolled at the Rhode Island School of Design (RISD), where she majored in film in 1989. She also sat in on poetry classes and wrote music to go with her student films. But songwriting remained her passion.

Career
After graduating from RISD, Nova moved to London, a place she called home for twelve years (she already had British citizenship due to her Bermudian origins). In 1990, she released her first recording, Heather Frith, an EP; she had not yet changed her name. The new name debuted in 1993 with her second EP entitled Spirit in You and her first full album, the critically acclaimed Glow Stars, produced by Felix Tod, after being discovered by Big Cat label manager Steven Abbott. The success of the album led her to record and release her first live album Blow the same year.

In 1994, she released Oyster, her breakout album that was produced by Youth and Felix Tod and began almost two years of touring. Another live album, Live from the Milky Way, was released in 1995. Siren, the follow-up to Oyster because of the hit single "London Rain", was released in 1998, after which she joined Sarah McLachlan and others on the North American Lilith Fair, a music festival with only female performers. After the release of Siren and a world tour to promote the record, Nova took a break while various television show and film soundtracks licensed some of her songs and her record company (Sony Records/The WORK Group) released various singles from the album, which received only moderate play on America's MTV2, Europe's MTV and Canada's MuchMusic and on mainstream radio, although she was popular on college radio. Also during this time, she recorded a version of the often covered traditional song "Gloomy Sunday", for the German WWII feature film drama Ein Lied von Liebe und Tod (released under the international title, Gloomy Sunday). In 2000, Nova released yet another live album entitled Wonderlust.

Over the years, Nova has written and recorded over 120 songs. With the release of South (2001), she returned to the international spotlight with an appearance on the soundtrack of the John Cusack movie Serendipity.  She also appeared on the soundtrack to the Sean Penn film, I Am Sam and sung on The Crow: City of Angels. A collaboration with Swedish indiepop band Eskobar, for a song called "Someone New", led to its music video being played primarily on America's MTV. Storm, Nova's fifth studio album, recorded with Mercury Rev as her backing band, was released in late 2003 on her own Saltwater label, went top 5 in Germany, followed by a tour during which Nova became pregnant. She quickly followed the birth of her son with her next record Redbird, released in 2005, again Top 10 in Germany.

In December 2005, Nova released Together As One, an EP supporting the Bermuda Sloop Foundation which operates the Bermuda sloop Spirit of Bermuda. In 2002, she self-published The Sorrowjoy, a 72-page book of her poetry and drawings. An album of the same name was unofficially released in March 2006, which featured Nova reading the poems from her book set to ambient music. She also collaborated with the German trance artist ATB on tracks like "Love Will Find You", "Feel You Like a River" and the international hit "Renegade". In 2008, she released an album called The Jasmine Flower, a solar powered acoustic album recorded in Bermuda, before touring as an acoustic tour.

In late 2010 she embarked on another European tour promoting her The Jasmine Flower album. On this tour, she played four unreleased songs ("Save a Little Piece of Tomorrow", "Everything Changes", "Burning to Love", and "Turn the Compass Round") that are included on her album, 300 Days at Sea, produced by Felix Tod. This full-band album was released on 27 May 2011. In late 2014, she began working on studio album called The Way It Feels which was released in May 2015. Her tenth album, Pearl, was released on 28 June 2019.

Nova released her latest album, Other Shores, on 26 August 2022.

Discography

Studio albums

Poetry albums
 The Sorrowjoy (2006)

Live albums
 Blow (1993)
 Live from the Milky Way EP (1995)
 Wonderlust (2000)

EPs
 Heather Frith (1990)
 Spirit in You (1993)
 Live from the Milky Way (1995)
 The First Recording (1997) – Heather Frith reissue
 Together as One (2005)
 Higher Ground (2011)

Singles

DVDs
 2004: Live at the Union Chapel

Books
 The Sorrowjoy,

References

Sources

External links
 Official Heather Nova website
 Discography and song list
 POTSI (archived): Heather Nova Biography
 POTSI (archived): Heather Nova Discography
 [ Biography] at AllMusic

1967 births
Living people
Bermudian singer-songwriters
Bermudian women guitarists
Women rock singers
Rhode Island School of Design alumni
V2 Records artists
Bermudian people of Canadian descent
The Putney School alumni
21st-century women singers
Rhode Island School of Design alumni in music